¡Globalquerque! is an annual music festival held each September at the National Hispanic Cultural Center in Albuquerque, New Mexico.  Along with evening concerts, the festival also features a free Global Fiesta community day on with workshops, films, presentations, inter-activities and performances, as well as the Global Village of Craft, Culture & Cuisine, open throughout all parts of the festival, and featuring international food, art and artisan crafts available for sale.  The performances also reach tens of thousands of listeners in the U.S. and Canada through live broadcasts on Native Voice 1 and Southwest Stages.

History
The festival, first presented in 2005, has featured musicians from six continents. After an initial one-night event, ¡Globalquerque! expanded into a two-day festival with an attendance of over 4,000.

Performers

Acts from around the world that have performed at previous editions of ¡Globalquerque! include:

 17 Hippies
 Jojo Abot
 Afro-Cuban All Stars
 Kiran Ahluwalia
 Alborz Trio
 Rahim AlHaj
 A Moving Sound
 Anda Union
 aneXo al Norte
 Anjani's Kathak Dance of India
 Antonia Apodaca
 Khaïra Arby
 Aurelio
 Fareed Ayaz & Abu Muhammad
 Aynur
 Susana Baca
 Baka Beyond
 Baldino
 Baka Beyond
 Baraka Moon
 Jay Begaye
 Debashish Bhattacharya
 Bideew Bou Bess
 The Big Spank 
 The Bills
 Black Eagle
 Blick Bassy
 Bombino
 Burkina Electric
 Calypso Rose
 Canteca de Macao
 Canzoniere Grecanico Salentino
 Cava
 Cellicion Zuni Dancers
 Charanga Cakewalk
 Chirgilchin
 Cimmarón
 Lankandia Cissoko
 Robert "Tree" Cody & Native Wisdom Dance Theatre
 Coreyah
 The Cowboy Way
 Cuarenta y Cinco
 Curumin
 DahkaBrahka
 Rocky Dawuni
 Maria de Barros
 Delgres
 Deolinda
 DePedro
 Kassé Mady Diabaté
 Prince Diabaté
 Lila Downs
 Dragon Art Studio
 Tony Duncan
 DVA
 EarthRise Sound System
 EastRiver Ensemble
 Youssra El Hawary
 Alejandro Escovedo
 Engine
 Liu Fang
 Vieux Farka Touré
 Majek Fashek and the Prisoners Of Conscience 
 Federspiel
 Felix y Los Gatos
 Fémina
 Fiamma Fumana
 Samantha Fish
 The Flatlanderswith Tom Russell
 Forro in the Dark
 Frigg
 Fula Flute Ensemble
 Gaida
 Gamelan Encantada
 Genticorum
 Gjallarhorn
 Golem
 Marta Gómez
 Louie Gonnie
 Derek Gripper
 Hassan Hakmoun
 Hapa
 Joy Harjo
 Mickey Hart's Global Drum Project
 Jarlath Henderson
 Herencia de Timbiquí
 Hong Sung Hyun’s Chobeolbi
 Pascuala Ilabaca y Fauna
 Iļģi
 Indian Ocean
 Jah9
 Beto Jamaica
 Markus James and Wassonrai
 Jemez Seasonal Dancers
 Orlando Julius & The Afrosoundz
 Jupiter + Okwess
 Mor Karbasi
 Mamak Khadem
 Daniel Kahn & The Painted Bird
 Maya Kamaty
 Kardemimmit
 Kenge Kenge
 Kinky
 Kobo Town
 Oumar Konaté
 Assane Kouyate
 Krar Collective
 Kusun Ensemble
 LADAMA
 La Dame Blanche
 La Familia Vigil
 Las Flores del Valle
 Bettye LaVette
 Doyle Lawson & Quicksilver
 Lemon Bucket Orkestra
 Ricardo Lemvo & Makina Loca
 Les Yeux Noirs
 Yungchen Lhamo
 Little Cow
 Kevin Locke
 Lo Còr de la Plana
 Lo'Jo
 Lone Piñon
 Germán Lopéz
 Los Amigos Invisibles
 Los de Abajo
 Los Gaiteros de San Jacinto
 Los Galliñeros
 Los Martinez
 Los Matachines de Bernalillo
 Los Primos featuring Lenore Armijo
 Los Reyes de Albuquerque
 Los Texmaniacs
 Lura
 Betsayda Machado y La Parranda El Clavo
 Luísa Maita
 Thomas Mapfumo and The Blacks Unlimited 
 Mariachi Mystery Tour
 Yolanda Martinez
 Emel Mathlouthi
 Frank McCulloch y Sus Amigos
 Melody of China
 Nacha Mendez
 Mexican Institute of Sound
 Emeline Michel
 Bill Miller
 Robert Mirabal
 Mokoomba
 Mono Blanco
 Ali Akbar Moradi Ensemble
 Gaby Moreno
 Shelley Morningsong
 Oliver Mtukudzi
 R. Carlos Nakai Earth Sounds Ensemble
 Nation Beat
 Native Roots
 Nawal
 Niyaz
 noJazz
 Non Stop Bhangara
 Nortec Collective Presents: Bostich + Fussible
 Nosotros
 Maarja Nuut
 Novalima
 Erkan Oğur's Telvin Trio
 Olodum
 Dona Onete
 Orchid Ensemble
 Oreka Tx
 Orkestra Mendoza
 Otava Yo
 Dwayne Ortega & The Young Guns
 Ozomatli
 Plena Libre
 Puerto Plata
 Razia
 Martha Redbone
 Red Stick Ramblers
 Reelroadъ
 Sofía Rei
 Rhythm of Rajasthan
 Rio Mira
 Leon Russell
 Buffy Sainte-Marie
 Saints & Tzadiks: Susan McKeown & Lorin Sklamberg
 Christine Salem
 Samarabalouf
 Poncho Sánchez
 Eli Secody
 Keith Secola Band
 Sergent Garcia
 Noura Mint Seymali
 Simon Shaheen
 Shooglenifty
 Sierra Leone's Refugee All Stars
 Sihasin
 Sky City Buffalo Ram Dance Group
 Slonovski Bal
 Jill Sobule
 Solas
 Söndörgő
 Sons of the Rio Grande
 Chango Spasiuk
 Nano Stern
 Rajab Suleiman & Kithara
 Supaman
 Koko Taylor
 Clark Tenakhongva
 Líber Terán
 Te Vaka
 Andrew Thomas
 Ti-Coca & Wanga-Nègès
 T.O. Combo
 Joe Tohonnie Jr. & The White Mountain Apache Crown Dancers 
 Trad.Attack!
 Trio Da Kali
 Vân-Ánh Võ
 Väsen with Darol Anger & Mike Marshall
 ¡Viva la Pepa! 
 Cedric Watson & Bijou Creole
 Savina Yannatou
 Yjastros
 Mary Youngblood
 Yuri Yunakov Ensemble
 Zeb and Haniya

Reviews
The festival has been acclaimed as "one of the country's top world music festivals." National Geographic called ¡Globalquerque! "another great regional 'microfestival' that punches far above its weight... New Mexico's ¡Globalquerque! festival offers some of the most adventurous world music programming set against one of the Southwest's most beautiful cities... the festival is becoming a destination in its own right," while the U.K. publication Songlines hailed it as "world-class."

References

External links
 Festival web page
 Local iQ profile
 Daily Lobo profile
 National Geographic feature on music festivals

2005 establishments in New Mexico
Music festivals in New Mexico
Music festivals established in 2005
World music festivals